During the COVID-19 pandemic, social distancing measures have been implemented nearly worldwide in order to slow the spread of the disease. This article details the history of the social distancing measures, a list of countries implementing them, when they were implemented, and other details about the measures. Except where stated otherwise, dates in this article refer to the year 2020.

Background 

Social distancing, or physical distancing, is a set of non-pharmaceutical interventions or measures taken to prevent the spread of a contagious disease by maintaining a physical distance between people and reducing the number of times people come into close contact with each other.

During the COVID-19 pandemic, social distancing and related measures were recommended by several governments as alternatives to an enforced quarantine of heavily affected areas. According to UNESCO monitoring, more than a hundred countries implemented nationwide school closures in response to COVID-19, impacting over half the world's student population. In the United Kingdom, the government advised the public to avoid public spaces, and cinemas and theatres voluntarily closed to encourage the government's message.

With many people at the time disbelieving that COVID-19 is any worse than the seasonal flu, it was difficult to convince the public to voluntarily adopt social distancing practices. In Belgium, media reported a rave was attended by at least  before it was broken up by local authorities. Beaches were closed in Florida and Alabama to disperse partygoers during spring break. Weddings were broken up in New Jersey and an 8p.m. curfew was imposed in Newark. New York, New Jersey, Connecticut and Pennsylvania were the first states to adopt coordinated social distancing policies which closed down non-essential businesses and restricted large gatherings. Shelter in place orders in California were extended to the entire state on 19 March. On the same day, Texas declared a public disaster and imposed statewide restrictions.

These preventive measures such as social-distancing and self-isolation prompted the widespread closure of primary, secondary, and post-secondary schools in more than 120 countries. As of 23 March 2020, more than 1.2 billion learners were out of school due to school closures in response to COVID-19. Given low rates of COVID-19 symptoms among children, the effectiveness of school closures has been called into question. Even when school closures are temporary, it carries high social and economic costs. However, the significance of children in spreading COVID-19 is unclear. While the full impact of school closures during the coronavirus pandemic are not yet known, UNESCO advises that school closures have negative impacts on local economies and on learning outcomes for students.

In early March 2020, the sentiment "Stay The Fuck Home" was coined by Florian Reifschneider, a German engineer and was quickly echoed by notable celebrities such as Taylor Swift, Ariana Grande and Busy Philipps in hopes of reducing and delaying the peak of the outbreak. Facebook, Twitter and Instagram also joined the campaign with similar hashtags, stickers and filters under #staythefhome, #stayhome, #staythefuckhome and began trending across social media. The website claims to have reached about two million people online and says the text has been translated into 17 languages.

It has been suggested that improving ventilation and managing exposure duration can reduce transmission.

Afghanistan 
 28 March: Lockdown of Kabul.
 1 April: Lockdown of Ghazni.

Australia 

 20 March: Restrictions on non-essential events.
 Non-essential indoor gatherings of greater than 100 people banned.
 Outdoor events with more than 500 attendees banned.
 22 March: Restrictions on social gatherings and 'non-essential' businesses.
 Facilities restricted from opening: Pubs, registered and licensed clubs (excluding bottle shops attached to these venues), hotels (excluding accommodation); gyms and indoor sporting venues; cinemas, entertainment venues, casinos, and nightclubs; restaurants and cafes were limited to takeaway and/or home delivery; religious gatherings, places of worship or funerals (in enclosed spaces and other than very small groups and where the '1 person per 4sqm' (40 sq. ft.) rule applies).
 29 March: Restriction on public gatherings to two people.

China 
 23 January: Travel from Wuhan prohibited.
 29 January: People ordered to stay home unless necessary.
 4 February: all higher education moved online.

Denmark 
 13 March: All non-essential public services closed, including schools and day cares.
 17 March: Gatherings of more than 10 people banned.

Germany 
 16 March: Non-essential public services closed.
 22 March: Public gatherings banned. Curfews (with exceptions for certain essential activities) implemented in 5 of the 16 federal states. Entry-ban for non-residents (including German citizens with residence in another federal state) implemented in an additional 2 of the 16 federal states.

Indonesia 

 15 March: President Joko Widodo has called upon for all Indonesians to exercise social distancing measures, with some regional leaders who have already closed down schools and public places. In a statement the following day, he stated that he was not going for a full lockdown and lightly criticised regional leaders who did implement lockdown.
 31 March: President Joko Widodo signed the Government Law Regulation No. 21/2020, which regulated large-scale social restrictions (PSBB), allowing regional governments to restrict the movement of people and goods in and out of their respective localities provided they had received permission from the relevant ministry (in this case the Ministry of Health, under Terawan Putranto). The law also defined a "minimal" restriction as including school and work holidays, limitations on physical worship, and limitations on public gatherings. At the same time, Presidential Decision 11/2020 was also signed, declaring a national disaster. Both laws were based on the Law No. 6 of 2018 on Medical Quarantines, which had provisions for PSBB.

Ireland
On 12 March 2020, Taoiseach Leo Varadkar announced from Washington measures intended to stop COVID-19 spreading, including the closure of all schools, universities and childcare facilities from the following day, as well as the closure of all cultural institutions and the cancellation of "all indoor mass gatherings of more than 100 people and outdoor mass gatherings of more than 500 people". After returning home earlier than anticipated from his visit to the United States, Taoiseach Varadkar addressed the nation on Saint Patrick's Night during A Ministerial Broadcast by An Taoiseach Leo Varadkar, TD, introducing television viewers to the concept of "cocooning". On 27 March, the first stay-at-home order banned all non-essential travel and contact with others. It was the longest in Europe, especially for hospitality and retail.

On 15 September 2020, the Government of Ireland announced a medium-term plan for living with COVID-19 that included five levels of restrictions.

Netherlands 
 12 March: Gatherings of more than 100 people banned.
 13 March: Prison visitations limited to legal affairs.
 15 March: All food and beverage outlets, bars, cafes, restaurants, gyms, saunas, sex clubs and coffee shops required to close, except for takeaway and delivery services. Schools closed.
 17 March: All education services closed.
 23 March: Visits to youth, disability and psychiatric care restricted.
 23 March: Ban on non-essential outdoors activities, gatherings with more than 2 people banned, 1.5 meter introduced.

New Zealand 
 21 March: Restricted visits to aged care facilities.
 22 March: At risk individuals ordered to stay home.
 23 March: All individuals ordered to stay home unless carrying essential activities.
 23 March: All non-essential services closed.

Pakistan 
 13 March: Educational institutions closed and public gatherings banned.
 20 March: Non-essential government employees forced into remote work.
 20-point precautionary measures consensus in Pakistan

Russia 
 16 March: higher educational institutions switch to distance education.
 18 March: announced schools dismiss for three weeks, employees are urged to allow remote work.
 19 March: mandatory 2 weeks self-isolation for all travelers entering the country.
 22 March: citywide lockdown in Moscow for a week.
 27 March: all international flights suspended.
 30 March: lockdown prolonged up to 30 April.
 30 March: St Petersburg and several regions join the lockdown.

Singapore 
Below is a summary of the Risk Levels being imposed by the government:

Turkey
 12 March: Closed schools and universities.
 15 March: Closed libraries, pavilions, discotheques, bars and night clubs.
 16 March: Closed mosques, cafes, gyms, Internet cafés and movie theaters.
 19 March: Postponed football, volleyball, basketball and handball leagues.
 21 March: Imposed a total curfew for those who are over the age 65 or chronically ill. Closed restaurants, dining places and patisseries to the public for dining in, only allowing home delivery and take-away.
 3 April: Extended the curfew to people younger than 20 years old.
 10 April: Declared curfews for the upcoming weekend in the 30 provinces with metropolitan status and Zonguldak, lasting for 48 hours.
 13 April: Announced that until further notice such curfews would be in force also during subsequent weekends.

United Kingdom 
 18 March: Closed schools.
 21 March: Closed bars, restaurants, cafes and other entertainment venues.
 22 March: Advised vulnerable people to stay at home.
 23 March: Initiated Lockdown Phase, Closed most businesses.
 Restaurants, pubs, cafes and the like must close, but can operate food delivery and takeaway services. All retail must close except for supermarkets, medical services, pharmacies, petrol stations, bicycle shops, hardware shops, gardening shops, corner shops and newsagents, alcohol shops, laundrettes, post offices, and some other retailers. Hotels and other accommodation services must close but may provide accommodation to stranded foreign nationals, critical workers and homeless and other vulnerable people. Libraries, museums, community centres, and places for worship must close. Gyms, parks, sports and recreation facilities must close.
 Directed people to stay home except for shopping for necessities, seeking medical care or looking after a vulnerable person, and travelling to and from work which cannot be done at home.

United States 

 Alabama (4 April), Alaska (28 March), Arizona (31 March), California (19 March), Colorado (26 March), Connecticut (23 March), District of Columbia (1 April), Florida (3 April), Georgia (3 April), Hawaii (25 March), Idaho (25 March), Illinois (21 March), Indiana (24 March), Kansas (30 March), Louisiana (23 March), Maine (2 April), Maryland (30 March), Michigan (24 March), Minnesota (27 March), Missouri (6 April), Montana (28 March), Nevada (1 April), New Hampshire (27 March), New Jersey (21 March), New Mexico (24 March), New York (22 March), North Carolina (30 March), Ohio (23 March), Oregon (23 March), Pennsylvania (1 April), Puerto Rico (15 March), Rhode Island (28 March), South Carolina (7 April), Tennessee (31 March), Texas (2 April), Vermont (25 March), Virginia (30 March), Washington (23 March), West Virginia (24 March), Wisconsin (25 March): Stay-at-home orders.
 Delaware (24 March), Mississippi (3 April): Shelter-in-place orders.
 Kentucky, 26 March: Healthy at home order.
 Massachusetts, 24 March: Stay at home advised.

Debate 
While enjoying broad support among epidemiologists, the social distancing measures are at times politically controversial. Intellectual support for the opposition tends to come from writers of other fields, although there are a few heterodox epidemiologists.

See also 
 COVID-19 pandemic lockdowns
 National responses to the COVID-19 pandemic
 Face masks during the COVID-19 pandemic

References 

Responses to the COVID-19 pandemic
Containment efforts related to the COVID-19 pandemic